Hermann-Friedrich Joppien (19 July 1912 – 25 August 1941) was a German Luftwaffe military aviator during World War II, a fighter ace who claimed 70 enemy aircraft shot down in roughly 270 combat missions. He claimed 42 victories over the Western Front, of which 23 were Supermarine Spitfires, the remaining victories were recorded over the Eastern Front.

Born in Bochum, Joppien volunteered for military service, at first with the Reichswehr of the Weimar Republic and later with the Luftwaffe of Nazy Germany. He was posted to Jagdgeschwader 51 (JG 51—51st Fighter Wing) in 1939 and fought in the Battle of France and Britain on the Western Front. In October 1940 he was given command of I. Gruppe (1st group) of JG 51. On account of his 40th aerial victory claimed, he was awarded Knight's Cross of the Iron Cross with Oak Leaves. It was Germany's highest military decoration at the time of its presentation to Joppien. Fighting on the Eastern Front, he was killed in action with Soviet fighters on 25 August 1941.

Early life and career
Joppien was born on 19 July 1912 in Bochum in the Province of Westphalia, a province of the Kingdom of Prussia. His father was a laborer and when he found new work in 1917, the family moved to Hersfeld. After Joppien completed his schooling, he received a vocational education and learned the trade of a typesetter in a printing firm. In October 1931, Joppien joined the military service with Infanterie-Regiment 15 (15th Infantry Regiment) of the Reichswehr of the Weimar Republic in Gießen. There he was promoted to Unteroffizier (corporal) in 1933.
	 
In parallel to his military service at Gießen, Joppien was very much interested and involved in glider construction and glider flight. His transfer to the Luftwaffe was somewhat delayed as Joppien had been tasked with the training of new officer recruits. On 15 October 1935, his transfer to the Luftwaffe was finally authorized. Until Christmas 1935, he had logged 100 solo flights and in June 1936 he became a flight instructor. He was promoted to Unterfeldwebel (junior non-commissioned officer) on 1 October 1936, to Feldwebel (non-commissioned officer) on 1 February 1937, and to Oberfeldwebel (staff sergeant) on 1 July 1937.
	 
He was then selected for officer training and posted to a Kriegsschule (war school). Graduating among the top of his class of 130 students, he was promoted to Leutnant (second lieutenant) on 23 December 1938. Initially serving as a pilot and Staffeloffizier (squadron officer) in Jagdgeschwader 2 "Richthofen" (JG 2—2nd Fighter Wing), named after the after World War I fighter ace Manfred von Richthofen, he was promoted to Oberleutnant (first lieutenant) on 1 June 1939. He then held the position of Technischer Offizier (technical officer) with Stab of Jagdgruppe 176 (176th Fighter Group), which was formed from the II. Gruppe (2nd Group) of Zerstörergeschwader 76 (ZG 76—76th Destroyer Wing). In mid 1939, Joppien was posted to the 1. Staffel (1st Squadron) of Jagdgeschwader 51 (JG 51—51st Fighter Wing).

World War II
World War II in Europe began on Friday, 1 September 1939, when German forces invaded Poland. On 23 November 1939, on the Western Front, Joppien claimed his first victory, an Armée de l'Air (French Air Force) Morane-Saulnier M.S.406 of GC III/7, piloted by Sergent (Sergeant) Guillaume who crash landed at Heillecourt where the aircraft completely burned out. During the encounter, his Messerschmitt Bf 109 was damaged by enemy fire resulting in undercarriage failure on landing. His aircraft overturned, fortunately for Joppien, he escaped unhurt. For this achievement, he was awarded the Iron Cross 2nd Class on 13 December 1939.

Battle of France and Britain
The Battle of France, the German invasion of France and the Low Countries, began on 10 May 1940. During this campaign, Joppien was awarded the Iron Cross 1st Class on 10 June 1940. By 25 June 1940, the date which marked the end of the French campaign, he claimed three further victories, which brought his total to four aerial victories. On 10 June, I. Gruppe was ordered to Jever Airfield and to Leeuwarden Airfield on 21 June. The Gruppe was then ordered to Saint-Inglevert Airfield on 12 July and participated in the Battle of Britain against the Royal Air Force (RAF).

On 5 August 1940, Joppien became Staffelkapitän (squadron leader) of the 1. Staffel (1st squadron) of JG 51. He succeeded Hauptmann Douglas Pitcairn who was injured in a takeoff accident that day. He claimed his first aerial victory as a Staffelkapitän on 11 August. That day, the Gruppe encountered RAF Supermarine Spitfire fighters off of Dover. During these battles, after 21 aerial victories claimed, he was awarded the Knight's Cross of the Iron Cross on 16 September 1940. Two days later, he was promoted to Hauptmann (captain).

He accumulated further victories against the RAF and on account of his 40th victory achieved on 21 April was honorably mentioned in the Wehrmachtbericht propaganda radio report, the first of three such mentions, on 22 April. The next day, he was the 11th officer or soldier of the Wehrmacht honored with the Knight's Cross of the Iron Cross with Oak Leaves which was presented to him by Adolf Hitler. On 18 October, Joppien was appointed Gruppenkommandeur (group commander) of I. Gruppe of JG 51. He succeeded Oberleutnant Richard Leppla who had temporarily led the Gruppe after its former commander, Hauptmann Hans-Heinrich Brustellin had taken been transferred. The Gruppe was withdrawn from operations at the English Channel on 25 May 1941 and relocated to Krefeld Airfield for a short period of maintenance and overhaul.

Operation Barbarossa and death
In June 1941, JG 51 and the majority of the Luftwaffe were transferred to the Eastern Front in preparation for Operation Barbarossa, the invasion of the Soviet Union on 22 June 1941. There, on 30 June 1941, he shot down five Soviet bombers near Bobruysk in eastern Belarus, his aerial victories 47–51. This "ace-in-a-day" achievement earned him his second mention in the Wehrmachtbericht on 1 July 1941. On 5 July 1941, he was wounded following his 58th victory claimed and spent several weeks in convalescence.

In the subsequent action Joppien was shot down and killed in his Messerschmitt Bf 109 F-2 (Werknummer 9670—factory number) "Black" by a Soviet Polikarpov I-16 fighter. Fleig saw that Joppien had attacked a Pe-2 bomber, which trailing smoke, was going down. Fleig then observed Joppien's Bf 109 making a sharp right turn and crashed into the ground. By this date, Joppien had shot down 70 enemy aircraft claimed in roughly 270 combat missions. The Wehrmachtbericht announced his death on 29 August 1941. Following his death, command of I. Gruppe went to Hauptmann Wilhelm Hachfeld who had previously commanded 2. Staffel.

Summary of career

Aerial victory claims
According to US historian David T. Zabecki, Joppien was credited with 70 aerial victories. Mathews and Foreman, authors of Luftwaffe Aces — Biographies and Victory Claims, researched the German Federal Archives and found records for 59 confirmed aerial victory claims, plus eleven further unconfirmed claims. This figure of confirmed claims includes 32 aerial victories on the Western Front and 27 on the Eastern Front.

Awards
 Iron Cross (1939)
 2nd Class (13 December 1939)
 1st Class (10 June 1940)
 Knight's Cross of the Iron Cross with Oak Leaves
 Knight's Cross on 16 September 1940 as Oberleutnant and Staffelkapitän of the 1./Jagdgeschwader 51
 11th Oak Leaves on 23 April 1941 as Hauptmann and Gruppenkommandeur of I./Jagdgeschwader 51
 Three named references in the Wehrmachtbericht (22 April 1941, 1 July 1941 and 29 August 1941)

Notes

References

Citations

Bibliography

 
 
 
 
 
 
 
 
 
 
 
 
 
 
 
 
 

1912 births
1941 deaths
Luftwaffe pilots
German World War II flying aces
Luftwaffe personnel killed in World War II
People from the Province of Westphalia
Recipients of the Knight's Cross of the Iron Cross with Oak Leaves
Aviators killed by being shot down
Military personnel from Bochum